"Do You Know" is a song by British R&B-soul singer, songwriter, actress and author Michelle Gayle, released in January 1997 as the first single from her second album, Sensational (1997). It was co-written by Gayle and received positive reviews from music critics. The song peaked at number six on the UK Singles Chart and number two on the UK R&B Singles Chart, making it her second highest charting single. A music video was produced to promote the single, directed by Randee St. Nicholas.

Critical reception
A reviewer from Music Week gave the song four out of five, adding, "Strong R&B and house remixes will boost the profile of a pop song which, though not as uplifting as previous hits, is sung stunningly well." The magazine's Alan Jones wrote, "Michelle Gayle is easily the most accomplished singer to emerge from television drama in recent years — no apologies to Robson & Jerome, or any of their ilk — and her career as a recording artist should be furthered by her latest single, Do You Know. A jangly, semi-acoustic mid-tempo pop song, it allows Gayle plenty of room to demonstrate her fine vocal style. Busier and more rhythmically accentuated house mixes deliver this one to the dance floor too, making its success ail the more likely." David Sinclair from The Times declared it as "[a] gently appealing, acoustic pop song more in the Joan Armatrading vein than the sugary sound of Gayle's previous hits."

Track listings
The "In the Mix" version of "Do You Know" contains six excerpts from various mixes of Gayle's songs: the Classic Expo and Tin Tin Out mixes of "Freedom", the West End mix of "Sweetness", the K-Klass mix of "Do You Know", the Bottom Dollar's Cream dub of "Happy Just to Be with You", and the Evolution mix of "Looking Up".

 UK CD1
 "Do You Know" (radio edit)
 "Do You Know" (In the Mix)
 "I'll Find You" (Body Bump 12-inch mix)

 UK CD2 (The Mixes)
 "Do You Know" (radio edit)
 "Do You Know" (Ignorants 'Spoonin' Mix)
 "Do You Know" (Linslee remix)
 "Do You Know" (Best Kept Secret remix)
 "Do You Know" (Tony De Vit mix)
 "Do You Know" (K-Klass vocal mix)
 "Do You Know" (Full Intention vocal mix)

 UK 12-inch single
A1. "Do You Know" (K-Klass vocal mix)
A2. "Do You Know" (K-Klass Pharmacy dub)
B1. "Do You Know" (Full Intention vocal mix)
B2. "Do You Know" (Linslee remix)
B3. "Do You Know" (Ignorants 'Spoonin' Mix)

 UK cassette single
 "Do You Know" (radio edit)
 "Do You Know" (In the Mix)

 European CD single
 "Do You Know" (K-Klass Klub edit)
 "Do You Know" (radio edit)

 German maxi-CD single
 "Do You Know" (radio edit)
 "Do You Know" (Ignorant 'Spoonin' remix)
 "Do You Know" (Linslee remix)
 "Do You Know" (Tony De Vit mix)
 "Do You Know" (K-Klass vocal mix)
 "Do You Know" (Full Intention vocal mix)

 Australian CD single
 "Do You Know" (radio edit)
 "Do You Know" (In the Mix)
 "Do You Know" (Tony De Vit mix)
 "Do You Know" (K-Klass vocal mix)
 "Do You Know" (Full Intention vocal mix)

Charts

Weekly charts

Year-end charts

Samples
In 2004, Dutch DJs Zentveld & Oomen, under the alias Angel City, created a track called "Do You Know (I Go Crazy)", which samples the lyrics of "Do You Know" and places them over the instrumental composition "Children" by Italian record producer Robert Miles. Released as a single in late 2004, "Do You Know (I Go Crazy)" became Angel City's highest- and longest-charting single in the UK, where it reached number eight on the UK Singles Chart, spending 15 weeks in the top 100. In Hungary, it reached number eight on the country's Dance Top 40 in January 2005. The song also charted in Ireland, the Netherlands, and the Flanders region of Belgium.

References

1997 songs
1997 singles
First Avenue Records singles
Bertelsmann Music Group singles
Michelle Gayle songs
Music videos directed by Randee St. Nicholas
RCA Records singles